Oleh Mykolayovych Kyrylov (born 7 September 1975) is a former Ukrainian football player.

References

1975 births
Sportspeople from Simferopol
Living people
Ukrainian footballers
FC Olympik Kharkiv players
FC Asmaral Moscow players
Ukrainian expatriate footballers
Expatriate footballers in Russia
Russian Premier League players
FC Metalist Kharkiv players
FC Arsenal Kharkiv players
FC Hazovyk-KhGV Kharkiv players
FC Helios Kharkiv players
Association football defenders
FC Neftekhimik Nizhnekamsk players
FC Nosta Novotroitsk players